The Geely Borui GE is a mid-sized sedan produced by the Chinese automaker Geely since 2018. The fastback sedan provides two hybrid driving mode of mild hybrid and plug in hybrid. The model made its appearance in March 2018, and went on sale on 28 May in the same year.

In late 2017 Geely unveiled a flagship hybrid fastback car 'K Model' (later renamed Geely Borui GT) based on the Geely Borui. It had renamed "Geely Borui GE" later. On 10 March 2018, the Chinese automaker Geely organized an activity of design interpretation and static shot of the new Borui GE in Suzhou, Jiangsu. it was the first shown of Geely Borui GE. In 2018 Beijing Auto Show, which was a month and a half after the event in Suzhou, the Borui GE was taking an important place in the booths.

Technology

The Geely Borui GE multimedia system provides touchable screen and is able to activate and control all systems in the car. The main screen takes some ideas from cell phone. In plug in models, there's also a key which infers users the electric vehicle settings.

Borui GE carries a full LED light system.
Borui GE carries a 7-speed dual-clutch gearbox co-developed by Geely and Volvo with an electronic gearknob. The liquid crystal dashboard, electronic handbrake, automatic parking, ACC system, seat heating and ventilation, electric boost, knee airbag and remote start are available in most models.

Technical specifications

Plug-in hybrid version
Borui GE PHEV carries an  ternary lithium battery provided by Ningde Century which supports power from charging piles outputs 6.6 kW or 3.3 kW and 220V household. When using 6.6 kW charging piles, Borui GE needs only 1.5 hours to finish charging and would able to cruise  or more without petrol. Battery uses "T segment" and a Geely "P2.5 system". The transmission carries a 1.5TD petrol engine and a 7-speed DCT gearbox. The peak torque of plug in version reaches .

Geely P2.5 Hybrid Drive System
Most European automakers use a hybrid system called P2, which means the electric power lies between the engine and the gearbox. However, Geely Borui GE puts its electric power on its dual-clutch gearbox. The e-machine is connected with one of the two clutches by an input shaft. The defect is that the clutch of even numbers would carry more  mechanical abrasion.

Mild hybrid version
Borui GE MHEV uses a 1.5T L3 petrol engine and carries a Geely P0 electric motor. The Borui GE P0 electric motor only provides a small battery and does not support pure electric drive. In fact the battery is only helping the three cylinder engine and the dual clutch transmission for fuel saving.

Naming
The "GE" in Borui GE might stand for grand evolution, genius efficient or Geely elite.

Sales and production
As the Geely Borui GE went on sale on 28 May 2018, about 2,000 units of car was sold in the first hour.
In 2018, 44299 units were sold.

Promotion event
Geely Auto had organised a driving activity on 10 May 2018, about three weeks before going on sale. The activity was mainly about the low of fuel consumption of Borui GE. The Beijing-Shanghai journey began on the morning of 10 May and ended at midnight. The highlight for this event was that each car used only a tank of petrol.

2020 facelift
The Borui received a facelift in August 2020 with the GE name dropped. The facelift features a 1.8-litre turbo engine mated to a 7-speed DCT. The front end sports a redesigned front bumper and the new vertical grilles and black trims, and all chrome trims are now blacked out on the facelift model.

References

External links

Borui GE
Cars introduced in 2018
Cars of China
Sedans
Plug-in hybrid vehicles
Mid-size cars
Front-wheel-drive vehicles